The Sportsperson of the Year awards are a group of awards awarded to the most popular Luxembourgish sportsperson of the preceding year. There are two main categories: one for men, and one for women (Trophée de la Meilleure Sportive). Other awards are given for the best team (Challenge de la Meilleure Equipe), best young sportsperson (Prix du Jeune Espoir), most honorable sportsperson (Prix d'Honneur), and for fair play (Prix du Fair play). The current holders of the main awards are Bob Bertemes and Christine Majerus, while the team award is held by F91 Dudelange.

List of winners

1954–1965
From 1954 until 1965, there was a single title of "Sportsperson of the Year", awarded to either a male or female sportsperson.

1966 onwards
It was decided to divide the contest into two from 1966, with separate categories for men and for women, as it has remained since.

Luxembourgish Team of the Year

This 3rd annual award was first give out in 1962.

Individual statistics

Winners of more than three titles

Titles by sport
Not including team of the year award.

Note: Nancy Kemp-Arendt's first two titles are categorised under swimming, and most recent three under triathlon.

References

External links
 Website

Lux
Sportspeople
 

Awards established in 1954
1954 establishments in Luxembourg